Reinventing Organizations: A Guide to Creating Organizations Inspired by the Next Stage of Human Consciousness is a book written by Frédéric Laloux and published in 2014. It lists the different paradigms of the human organizations through the ages and proposes a new one: Teal organisation. The latter is built on three pillars related to  wholeness, self-management, and evolutionary purpose.

Overview 
Frédéric Laloux screened and researched over fifty organisations, including Buurtzog Nederland and The Morning Star Company, with the following conditions: they had been operating for at least five years with a minimum of one hundred employees, and with a significant number of management practices that were consistent with the Teal level of consciousness. Laloux describes the five stages of organisational structure, each of which is designated a colour (Red, Amber, Orange, Green, Teal) depending on how 'evolved' they are. He describes the management structure and developments associated with each stage, such as the creation of meritocracy and replicable processes.

The current stage, Teal, is the one that Laloux has based his research and the book around. Teal is driven by self-management, intuitive reasoning, decentralised decision-making, wholeness, and a deeper sense of purpose. Depending on the edition, Laloux goes into varying detail about the practices associated with self-management, wholeness, and evolutionary purpose, as well as giving case studies that exemplify said practices.

See also
 Alternative Theory of Organization and Management
 Holacracy
 Holistic management
 Organizational culture
 Organization development
 Organizational theory
 Workers' self-management

Notes and references 
HuffPost, Reinventing Management, Part 1: What Color Is Your Organization?, 06/12/2017
Strategy+Business, The Future of Management Is Teal, 06/07/2015

Bibliography 
 Frederic Laloux. Reinventing Organisations: A Guide to Creating Organisations Inspired by the Next Stage of Human Consciousness. Nelson Parker.February 9, 2014.

References

External links
 
 Reinventing organizations wiki - the official wiki

2014 non-fiction books
Business books
Belgian books
Organizational studies